Notoriety is a 1922 American silent drama film directed by William Nigh and starring Maurine Powers, Mary Alden and Rod La Rocque.

Cast
 Maurine Powers as 'Pigeon' Deering
 Mary Alden as Ann Boland
 Rod La Rocque as Arthur Beal
 George Hackathorne as Batty
 Richard Travers as Tom Robbins
 J. Barney Sherry as Horace Wedderburn
 Mona Lisa as Dorothy Wedderburn
 Anders Randolf as Theatrical Agent
 John Goldsworthy as Van Dyke Gibson
 Ida Waterman as Mrs. Beal
 William Gudgeon as The Hired Man

References

Bibliography
 Munden, Kenneth White. The American Film Institute Catalog of Motion Pictures Produced in the United States, Part 1. University of California Press, 1997.

External links
 

1922 films
1922 drama films
1920s English-language films
American silent feature films
Silent American drama films
American black-and-white films
Films directed by William Nigh
1920s American films